Ray Crouse is a former running back in the National Football League.

Biography
Crouse was born Marlon Ray Crouse on March 16, 1959, in Oakland, California. His son, Michael Crouse, is a professional baseball player.

Career
Crouse played in 16 games with the Calgary Stampeders of the Canadian Football League in 1983, then appeared in 16 games for the 1984 Green Bay Packers of the National Football League, and then returned to the CFL to play 16 games total for the BC Lions in the 1986 and 1987 seasons.

He played at the collegiate level at the University of Nevada, Las Vegas.

References

Players of American football from Oakland, California
Green Bay Packers players
Calgary Stampeders players
BC Lions players
American football running backs
UNLV Rebels football players
Living people
Year of birth missing (living people)